Clara Isabel Alegría Vides (May 12, 1924 – January 25, 2018), also known by her pseudonym Claribel Alegría, was a Nicaraguan-Salvadoran poet, essayist, novelist, and journalist who was a major voice in the literature of contemporary Central America. She was awarded the 2006 Neustadt International Prize for Literature.

Biography
Alegría was born in Estelí, Nicaragua, to a Nicaraguan father, Daniel Alegría, and a Salvadoran mother, Ana María Vides. Her cousin was activist Leonel Gómez Vides. When Claribel was nine months old, her father was sent into exile for protesting human rights violations occurring during the United States occupation of Nicaragua; as a result, Claribel grew up in Santa Ana, a city in western El Salvador, where her mother came from. Claribel Alegría considered herself to be Nicaraguan-Salvadorean. Although she was too young to read or write, she began composing poetry at the age of six and dictated them to her mother, who would write them down. Alegría consistently cited Rainer Maria Rilke's "Letters to a Young Poet" as the impetus for becoming a poet. At the age of seventeen, she published her first poems in Repertorio Americano, a Central American cultural supplement. Soon after, Mexican educator José Vasconcelos arranged for Alegría to attend finishing school in Hammond, Louisiana. In 1943, she moved to the United States and in 1948 received a B.A. in Philosophy and Letters from George Washington University. Alegría was committed to nonviolent resistance. She had a close association with the Sandinista National Liberation Front (FSLN), which overthrew Anastasio Somoza Debayle and took control of the Nicaraguan government in 1979. Alegría returned to Nicaragua in 1985 to aid in the reconstruction of Nicaragua.

Alegría later lived in Managua, Nicaragua. She died on 25 January 2018, aged 93.

Career
Alegría's literary work reflects the style of the popular literary current in Central America during the 1950s and 1960s, "la generacion comprometida" (the committed generation). Like many other poets of her generation who are critical of their societies, she made claims for rights using a language which is often counter-literary.

Alegría published many books of poetry: Casting Off (2003), Sorrow (1999), Umbrales (1996), and La Mujer del Río (1989). She also published novels and children's stories, as well as testimonies (often in collaboration with her husband, DJ "Bud" Flakoll), such as They Won't Take Me Alive.

Awards
 1978 Cuban-sponsored Casa de las Américas for Sobrevivo ("I Survive"), a poetry collection. She was awarded this prize alongside Gioconda Belli.
 2006 Neustadt International Prize for Literature.
 2017 XXVI Premio Reina Sofía de Poesía Iberoamericana by the Universidad de Salamanca and the Spanish Patrimonio Nacional.

Published works

 Anillo de silencio (1948)
 Suite de amor, angustia y soledad (1950)
 Vigilias (1953)
 Acuario (1955)
 Tres cuentos (1958)
 Huésped de mi tiempo (1961)
 Vía única (1965)
 Cenizas de Izalco (1966)
 Aprendizaje (1970)
 Pasaré a cobrar y otros poemas (1973)
 Sobrevivo (1978, Premio Casa de las Américas de Poesía)
 La encrucijada salvadoreña (1980)
 Nicaragua: la revolución sandinista (1980)
 Flores del volcán; Suma y sigue (1981)
 Flowers from the Volcano (1983)
 No me agarran viva: la mujer salvadoreña en lucha (1983)
 Para Romper El Silencio: Resistencia Y lucha en las cárceles salvadoreñas (1983)
 Álbum familiar (1984)
 Despierta, mi bien, despierta (1986)
 Luisa en el país de la realidad (1987)
 Cenizas de Izalco (1989)
 Woman of the River (Pitt Poetry Series) (1989)
 They Won't Take Me Alive: Salvadoran Women in Struggle for National Liberation (1990)
 Family Album (1991)
 Fugue (1993)
 Death of Somoza (1996)
 Thresholds/Umbrales: Poems (1996)
 Tunnel to Canto Grande (1996)
 El Nino Que Buscaba A Ayer (1997)
 Sorrow (1999)
 Casting Off (2003)
 Soltando Amarras (2003)

In English translation
 Flowers from the Volcano, trans. Carolyn Forché (Pittsburgh, University of Pittsburgh, 1983)
 Luisa in Realityland, trans. Darwin J. Flakoll (New York: Curbstone Press, 1987) 
 Sorrow, trans. Carolyn Forché (New York: Curbstone Press, 1999) 
 Soltando Amarras/Casting Off: Poems by Claribel Alegría, trans. Margaret Sayers Peden (Willimantic: Curbstone Press, 2003) 

In anthology
 Ghost Fishing: An Eco-Justice Poetry Anthology (University of Georgia Press, 2018)

References

Further reading

External links

 Claribel Alegría gana premio internacional 
 Encuentro-Taller con Claribel Alegría 
 Academy of American Poets 
 Claribel Alegria at Curbstone Press 

1924 births
2018 deaths
Columbian College of Arts and Sciences alumni
Nicaraguan essayists
Nicaraguan journalists
Nicaraguan women essayists
Nicaraguan women journalists
Nicaraguan women poets
Nicaraguan translators
People from Estelí Department
People from Santa Ana Department
Salvadoran journalists
Salvadoran poets
Salvadoran translators
Salvadoran women writers
Nicaraguan women children's writers
Salvadoran women children's writers
Salvadoran women journalists
20th-century essayists
20th-century Nicaraguan poets
20th-century novelists
20th-century translators
21st-century essayists
21st-century novelists
21st-century poets
21st-century translators
20th-century Nicaraguan writers
21st-century Nicaraguan writers
20th-century Nicaraguan women writers
21st-century Nicaraguan women writers
20th-century Salvadoran women writers
21st-century Salvadoran women writers
Pseudonymous women writers
Nicaraguan emigrants to El Salvador
Salvadoran expatriates in the United States
20th-century pseudonymous writers
21st-century pseudonymous writers